Slave to the Music may refer to:

Slave to the Music (album), an album by Twenty 4 Seven
"Slave to the Music" (Twenty 4 Seven song)
"Slave to the Music" (James Morrison song)